Aldhal is a village in the southern state of Karnataka, India. Administratively, it is under Kakkasgera panchayat village, Shahapur Taluka of Yadgir district in Karnataka. Aldhal is 5 km by road west of the village of Wanadurga and 9.5 km by road southwest of the village of Hoskera. The nearest railhead is in Yadgir.

Demographics 
At the 2001 census, Aldhal had 1,051 inhabitants, with 558 males and 493 females.

See also
 Shahapur
 Yadgir

References

External links
 

Villages in Yadgir district